Rundle Peaks is a cluster of mainly ice-covered peaks at the south side of Byrd Glacier, just east of Sefton Glacier. Named by Advisory Committee on Antarctic Names (US-ACAN) for Arthur S. Rundle, a member of the United States Antarctic Research Program (USARP) parties which made glaciological and geophysical studies on the Ross Ice Shelf, 1961–62 and 1962–63.
 

Mountains of Oates Land